John A. Hirsch (July 9, 1861 – November 29, 1938) was a Republican member of the Massachusetts House of Representatives from Dedham, Massachusetts. He was born in Norwood, Massachusetts on July 9, 1861. He died November 29, 1938, and was buried from the Allin Congregational Church.

See also
 1916 Massachusetts legislature
 1917 Massachusetts legislature
 1918 Massachusetts legislature

References

Republican Party members of the Massachusetts House of Representatives
People from Norwood, Massachusetts
Politicians from Dedham, Massachusetts
1861 births
1938 deaths
Place of death missing